Salettes may refer to:

 Salettes, Drôme
 Salettes, Haute-Loire